Charles Whitham was the author of the oft-reprinted Western Tasmania: A land of Riches and Beauty, which was a comprehensive study of the geographical features of West Coast, Tasmania and the conditions of the region in the 1920s.

Early life
Charles Whitham was born in India in 1873.  He and his parents travelled to Tasmania in 1886.

His first book was published in 1917.

Western Tasmania
The book was originally published in 1924 and reprinted in 1949 and in 1984.
Extracts from the book were reproduced in The Mercury in the 1930s.
The book is a mix of geographical and historical information about the west coast, and includes sections on Macquarie Harbour and the Mount Lyell Mining and Railway Company. 
 
Whitham had personally travelled to many of the locations and features that he described as well as to most of the peaks of the West Coast Range.  His photographs in the State Library of Tasmania attest to some of the places that he had visited.

It was not until the writing of Geoffrey Blainey's The Peaks of Lyell in the 1950s that the history and geography of the west coast of Tasmania was thoroughly reviewed and showed the important contribution of Whitham's earlier work.

A collection of articles by Whitham was collected by Kleinig in the 2000s.

Later life and death
Whitham moved to Sydney in the 1920s, and died there in December 1940.

Other works

Notes

External links
Charles Whitham photographs - online at State Library of Tasmania

History of Tasmania
Western Tasmania